Syrians in Sweden are citizens and residents of Sweden who are of Syrian descent. As of 2019, there were 191,530 residents of Sweden born in Syria, and 50,620 born in Sweden with at least one Syrian-born parent.

Demographics

Most Syrians residing in Sweden arrived as asylum seekers following the Syrian Civil War, which began in 2011. According to Statistics Sweden, as of 2016, there 116,384 citizens of Syria (70,060 men, 46,324 women) residing in Sweden. There are an estimated 18,000 of the latter immigrants living in Södertälje. As of 2016, 5,459 Syrian citizens (2,803 men, 2,656 women) residing in Sweden are registered as asylum seekers. In 2016, there were 39 registered emigrations from Sweden to Syria.

Education
In 2010, there were 18,292 students with Arabic as their mother tongue who participated in the state-run Swedish for Immigrants adult language program. Of these pupils, 3,884 had 0-6 years of education in their home country (Antal utbildningsår i hemlandet), 3,383 had 7-9 years of education in their home country, and 11,025 had 10 years education or more in their home country. As of 2012, 18,886 pupils with Arabic as their mother tongue, as well as 3,257 Syria-born students were enrolled in the language program.

, according to Statistics Sweden, 35% of Syria-born individuals aged 25 to 64 have attained a primary and lower secondary education level (37% men, 34% women), 22% have attained an upper secondary education level (21% men, 23% women), 21% have attained a post-secondary education level of less than 3 years (21% men, 22% women), 15% have attained a post-secondary education of 3 years or more (16% men, 14% women), and 6% have attained an unknown education level (6% men, 7% women).

Employment
According to Statistics Sweden, as of 2014, the employment rate is approximately 32% for Syrian-born immigrants.

According to the Institute of Labor Economics, as of 2014, Syrian-born individuals residing in Sweden have an employment population ratio of about 28%. They also have an unemployment rate of around 14%.

Notable people

See also
Demographics of Syria
Education in Sweden
Education in Syria
Islam in Sweden
Syrian diaspora
Syrians in Finland

References

Arabs in Sweden

Sweden

Middle Eastern diaspora in Sweden